In My World is the second studio album by Matthewdavid. It was released on Brainfeeder on June 30, 2014.

Critical reception

At Metacritic, which assigns a weighted average score out of 100 to reviews from mainstream critics, the album received an average score of 66, based on 10 reviews, indicating "generally favorable reviews".

Dylan Kilby of MusicOMH gave the album 4 out of 5 stars, describing it as "a cluster of deep house grooves, chopped and screwed R&B vocals, and sub-bass that would be played at a futuristic Stonewall Inn." Matt Bauer of Exclaim! gave the album an 8 out of 10, writing, "it jettisons its predecessor's more experimental tendencies in favour of psychedelic, neo-soul-pop filtered through Brainfeeder's expected eccentricity." Larry Fitzmaurice of Pitchfork gave the album a 5.4 out of 10, commenting that "his choice to sing, rap, and sing-rap throughout In My World is obviously risky; his vocals tend to distract from what surrounds them, and his skill on the mic is, at best, rudimentary."

Track listing

Personnel
Credits adapted from liner notes.

 Matthewdavid – production, recording, mixing, mastering
 D/P/I – co-production (3)
 The Light of Love Children's Choir – guest appearance (10)
 Logan White – photography
 Seth Ferris – design

References

External links
 

2014 albums
Brainfeeder albums